Zang Dhok Palri Phodang is a Tibetan Buddhist monastery in Kalimpong in West Bengal, India. The monastery is located atop Durpin Hill, one of the two hills of the town. It was consecrated in 1976 by the visiting Dalai Lama.

The monastery houses many rare scriptures that were brought into India after the annexation of Tibet in 1959. It also houses the 108 volumes of the Kangyur. It is also popularly known as the Durpin Monastery. The view from the hill-top is breathtaking.

Buddhist monasteries in West Bengal